Richard Gregory (20 January 1890 – 2 October 1925) was a Canadian rower. He competed in the men's eight event at the 1912 Summer Olympics.

References

1890 births
1925 deaths
Canadian male rowers
Olympic rowers of Canada
Rowers at the 1912 Summer Olympics
Rowers from Toronto